Spragueia dama, the southern spragueia moth, is a bird dropping moth in the family Noctuidae. The species was first described by Achille Guenée in 1852. It is found in North America.

The MONA or Hodges number for Spragueia dama is 9122.

References

Further reading

External links
 

Acontiinae
Articles created by Qbugbot
Moths described in 1852